The  was a Japanese political party formed by then-present and former regional government leaders. It was officially headed by Hiroshi Yamada; Hiroshi Nakada was secretary-general and former governor of Yamagata Hiroshi Saito led the party's policy committee.

References

External links

Anti-communist organizations in Japan
Conservative parties in Japan
Defunct political parties in Japan
Far-right politics in Japan
Libertarian parties in Japan
Political parties established in 2010
Political parties disestablished in 2012
2010 establishments in Japan
2012 disestablishments in Japan